Catharine Dowman (25 May 1878 – 19 September 1972) was an English philanthropist associated with Women's suffrage. and the restoration of the Cutty Sark

Family

Catharine was a member of the wealthy English Courtauld textile family. She was born in Bocking, Essex, the daughter of Sydney Courtauld (10 March 1840 – 20 October 1899) and Sarah Lucy Sharpe (1844-1906) and elder sister of Samuel Courtauld, founder of the Courtauld Institute of Art.

In 1912, she met her future husband, Wilfred Harry Dowman, whilst a passenger sailing from London to Sydney on the Port Jackson which was a cadet training ship. Wilfred was already married so they had to wait for his divorce before finally marrying in 1920.

Philanthropic work
In January 1922 Wilfred saw the then Ferreira when she put into Falmouth to repair storm damage. Recognising her as the clipper ship Cutty Sark he and Catherine strived to purchase her. They sold off parts of their estate, along with other vessels including the brigantine, the Lady of Avenal. Their vision for the Cutty Sark was she be used as a cadet training vessel

Over the next two years, the Dowman's funded the restoration of the ship and by 1924 Cutty Sark was proudly displayed as the flagship at the Fowey Regatta. For 16 years, Cutty Sark was moored in Falmouth and was used to train cadets until Wilfred's death in 1936 which prompted the sale in 1938 to the Thames Nautical Training College. Catharine continued to follow the Cutty Sark, last visiting the ship in 1968 at the age of 90.

In 1934 the Dowman's moved to Wyke Regis, near Weymouth, Dorset. Catherine was President of the 3rd Wyke Regis \ Weymouth South Scout Group (WSSG) until her death in 1972.

Women’s Suffrage
Catharine was a founder member of the Suffrage Atelier and the Artists' Suffrage League and used her art for the cause. Her Suffrage Atelier posters were often witty, such as the ‘Prehistoric Argument’. and the ‘Anti-Suffrage Ostrich’ and were widely distributed as postcards

References

1878 births
1972 deaths
Catharine
People from Bocking, Essex
English people of French descent